The Mulchén River is a river of Chile.

See also
List of rivers of Chile

References
 La Cuenca del Río Biobío

Rivers of Chile
Rivers of Biobío Region